Cymothoe collarti is a butterfly in the family Nymphalidae. It is found in the Democratic Republic of the Congo and Rwanda.

Subspecies
Cymothoe collarti collarti (Democratic Republic of the Congo: Ituri)
Cymothoe collarti werneri Beaurain, 1984 (Rwanda)

References

Butterflies described in 1942
Cymothoe (butterfly)